The Brighton Belle is a greyhound racing competition held annually. It was inaugurated in 1975 at Brighton & Hove Greyhound Stadium.

Past winners

Venues 
1975–present (Hove 515m)

Sponsors
1991–1991 (Worcester Control)
2001–2001 (Racing Post)
2002–2002 (Isonetric Broadband)
2006–2007 (Roy Pook)
2008–present (Coral)

Winning trainers
George Curtis 4
Brian Clemenson 4
Nick Savva 4

References

Greyhound racing competitions in the United Kingdom
Sport in Brighton and Hove
Recurring sporting events established in 1975